Steve White (born March 1961) is an American actor and comedian, best known for his roles in Spike Lee films.

Career 
White has worked with Spike Lee five times (Do the Right Thing in 1989, Mo' Better Blues in 1990, Malcolm X in 1992, Clockers in 1995, and Get on the Bus in 1996). From 1992 to 1997, White performed stand-up comedy on Russell Simmons's Def Comedy Jam on HBO and he also had a recurring role on the ABC comedy series Hangin' With Mr. Cooper. Steve was most recently one of the guest announcers on The Price Is Right. He also had guest appearances on 1990s black sitcom Living Single & Martin, which both aired on the Fox Network respectively.

White told the 92 KQRS Morning Show on January 24, 2013, that he will appear in Robert Townsend's latest film, Playin' for Love.

Filmography

Film

Television

References

External links

Living people
African-American male actors
American male comedians
21st-century American comedians
Place of birth missing (living people)
American male film actors
American male television actors
1961 births
21st-century African-American people
20th-century African-American people